The Lithuania national futsal team is controlled by the Lithuanian Football Federation, the governing body for futsal in Lithuania and represents the country in international futsal competitions, such as the World Cup and the European Championships. Lithuania has made their Futsal World Cup debut in 2021 as tournament hosts.

Results and fixtures

The following is a list of match results in the last 12 months, as well as any future matches that have been scheduled.
Legend

2021

Players

Current squad
Updated

Recent call-ups

Competitive record

FIFA Futsal World Cup

UEFA Futsal Championship

References

External links
(in Lithuanian) Lithuanian Football Association Official Website

 
Lithuania
national
1999 establishments in Lithuania